Staceyann Chin (born December 25, 1972) is a spoken-word poet, performing artist and LGBT rights political activist. Her work has been published in The New York Times, The Washington Post, and the Pittsburgh Daily, and has been featured on 60 Minutes. She was also featured on The Oprah Winfrey Show, where she shared her struggles growing up as a gay person in Jamaica. Chin's first full-length poetry collection was published in 2019.

Personal life
Chin was born in Jamaica but now lives in New York City, in Brooklyn. She is of Chinese-Jamaican and Afro-Jamaican descent. She announced in 2011 that she was pregnant with her first child, giving birth to daughter Zuri in January 2012. She has been candid about her pregnancy by means of in-vitro fertilization, and wrote about her experiences as a pregnant, single lesbian in a guest blog for the Huffington Post.

Career
Openly lesbian, she has been an "out poet and political activist" since 1998. In addition to performing in and co-writing the Tony-nominated Russell Simmons Def Poetry Jam on Broadway, Chin has appeared in Off-Broadway one-woman shows and at the Nuyorican Poets Cafe. She has also held poetry workshops worldwide. Chin credits her accomplishments to her hard-working grandmother and the pain of her mother's absence.

Chin's poetry can be found in her first chapbook, Wildcat Woman, the one she now carries on her back, Stories Surrounding My Coming, and numerous anthologies, including Skyscrapers, Taxis and Tampons, Poetry Slam, Role Call, Cultural Studies: Critical Methodologies. Chin's voice can be heard on CD compilations out of Bar 13- Union Square and Pow Wow productions. In 2009, Chin published her autobiographical novel, The Other Side of Paradise: A Memoir.

She has been a host on Logo's After Ellen Internet show, "She Said What?" and a co-host of Centric's My Two Cents.

In 2009, Chin performed in The People Speak, a documentary feature film that uses dramatic and musical performances of the letters, diaries, and speeches of everyday Americans, based on historian Howard Zinn's A People's History of the United States.

She taught a seminar at the arts-oriented Saint Ann's School in Brooklyn.

Critical analysis
Chin's "activist driven" work has garnered praise in various publications. Of her one-woman show Border/Clash, The New York Times wrote that Chin "is sassy, rageful and sometimes softly self-mocking." The Advocate wrote, "With poems that combine hilarious one-liners ("I told her I liked the way she made that pink push-up bra look intellectual") with a refusal to conform ("I want to be the dyke who likes to fuck men"), Chin is out to confront more than just the straight world." In the book, Words in Your Face: A Guided Tour Through Twenty Years of the New York City Poetry Slam, author Cristin O'Keefe Aptowicz referred to Chin as "definitely the prize to win" among the three New York City Poetry Slam venues during the years she competed, adding:

Awards
Chin was the winner of the 1999 Chicago People of Color Slam; first runner- up in the 1999 Outright Poetry Slam; winner of the 1998 Lambda Poetry Slam; a finalist in the 1999 Nuyorican Grand Slam; winner of the 1998 and 2000 Slam This!; and winner of WORD: The First Slam for Television. She has also been featured by Public-access television cable TV programs in Brooklyn and Manhattan as well as many local radio stations including, WHCR and WBAI. The Joseph Papp Public Theater has featured her on more than one occasion, and Staceyann has toured internationally, with performances in London, Denmark, Germany, South Africa and New York's own Central Park Summer Stage. In 2015, she was named by Equality Forum as one of their 31 Icons of the 2015 LGBT History Month.

Other Awards 

 Drama Desk Award (2003)
 Center for Women and Gender at Dartmouth College for the Visionary-in-Residence Award (2007)
 Human Rights Campaign Power of the Voice Award (2007)
 Lesbian AIDS Project Honors (2008)
 Safe Haven Award from Immigration Equality (2008)
 New York State Senate Special Human Rights Award (2009)

Works

Books
 The Other Side of Paradise - A Memoir. 2010. New York: Scribner. 
 Crossfire: A Litany for Survival. 2019. Chicago: Haymarket Books.

Chapbooks 

 Wildcat Woman (1998)
 Stories Surrounding My Coming (2001)
 Catalogue the Insanity (2005)
 Mad Hatter: Ramblings from the Attic Volume 1 (2007)
 Mad Hatter: Ramblings from the Attic Volume 2 (2007)

Theatre 

 Hands Afire (2000) (one-woman show) - Bleecker Theatre, New York
 Unspeakable Things (2001) (one-woman show) - Bleecker Theatre, New York
 Russell Simmons' Def Poetry Jam on Broadway (2002-2003)
 Border/Clash: A Litany of Desires (2005) (one-woman show) - Bleecker Theatre, New York 
 Motherstruck! (one-woman show) (2015-2016) (Run in Chicago, DC, and NYC)

Anthologies
 "Authenticity", in Black Cool: One Thousand Streams of Blackness. Edited by Rebecca Walker (Soft Skull Press, February 1, 2012)

Performances
 Staceyann Chin: Performed Poems in Trikster - Nordic Queer Journal #3, 2009.

Interviews
 Staceyann Chin & Ulrika Dahl: Articulating Honesty: A Conversation on Literature and Activism in Trikster - Nordic Queer Journal #3, 2009

References

External links

 

1972 births
Living people
African-American poets
American women poets
American feminists
Jamaican emigrants to the United States
American spoken word artists
American writers of Chinese descent
American writers of Jamaican descent
African-American feminists
Jamaican people of Chinese descent
LGBT African Americans
Lesbian feminists
Lesbian poets
American lesbian writers
Jamaican LGBT poets
American LGBT rights activists
Slam poets
Womanists
American LGBT poets
American LGBT people of Asian descent
Hakka writers
American people of Chinese descent
Feminist musicians
African-American women musicians
21st-century African-American people
21st-century African-American women
20th-century African-American people
20th-century African-American women
African-American women writers